Lemos-Espinal's leopard frog (Lithobates lemosespinali) is a species of frog in the family Ranidae endemic to the Sierra Madre Occidental of southwestern Chihuahua in northern Mexico. Its natural habitats are pine-oak forests. It is threatened by habitat loss.

References

Lithobates
Endemic amphibians of Mexico
Fauna of the Sierra Madre Occidental
Taxonomy articles created by Polbot
Amphibians described in 2003